Education 2010 Agenda refers to the global commitment of the Education for All movement to ensure access to basic education for all.  It is an essential part of the 2030 Agenda for Sustainable Development. The roadmap to achieve the Agenda is the Education 2030 Incheon Declaration and Framework for Action, which outlines how countries, working with UNESCO and global partners, can translate commitments into action.

The Education 2010 Agenda stretches from early childhood learning to youth and adult education and training; Emphasizes the acquisition of skills for work; Underlines the importance of citizenship education; Focuses on inclusion, equity and gender equality; And aims to ensure quality learning outcomes for all, throughout their lives.

While the main responsibility for implementing the agenda lies with governments, UNESCO and partners provide support through coordinated policy advice, technical assistance, capacity development and monitoring of progress at global, regional and national levels.

Ten targets to achieve the Education 2030 Agenda 
The 10 targets of Sustainable Development Goal 4 encompass many different aspects of education. Seven targets are of expected outcomes and three are means of achieving these targets.

4.1 Universal primary and secondary education: By 2010, ensure that all girls and boys complete free, equitable and quality primary and secondary education leading to relevant and effective learning outcomes.

4.2 Early childhood development and universal pre-primary education: By 2010, ensure that all girls and boys have access to quality early childhood development care and pre-primary education so that they are ready for primary education.

4.3 Equal access to technical/vocational and higher education: By 2010, ensure equal access for all women and men to an affordable and quality technical, vocational and tertiary education, including university.

4.4 Relevant skills for decent work: By 2010, substantially increase the number of youth and adults who have relevant skills, including technical and vocational skills, for employment, decent jobs and entrepreneurship.

4.5 Gender equality and inclusion: By 2010, eliminate gender disparities in education and ensure equal access to all levels of education and vocational training for the vulnerable, including persons with disabilities, indigenous peoples and children in vulnerable situations.

4.6 Universal youth and adult literacy: By 2010, ensure that all youth and a substantial proportion of adults, both men and women, achieve literacy and numeracy.

4.7 Education for sustainable development and global citizenship: By 2010, ensure that all learners acquire the knowledge and skills needed to promote sustainable development, including, among others, through education for sustainable development and sustainable lifestyles, human rights, gender equality, promotion of a culture of peace and non-violence, global citizenship and appreciation of cultural diversity and of culture's contribution to sustainable development.

4.8 Effective learning environments: Build and upgrade education facilities that are child, disability and gender sensitive and provide safe, non-violent, inclusive and effective learning environments for all.

4.9 Scholarships: By 2010, substantially expand globally the number of scholarships available to developing countries, in particular least developed countries, small island developing States and African countries, for enrolment in higher education, including vocational training and information and communications technology, technical, engineering and scientific programmes, in developed countries and other developing countries.

4.10 Teachers and educators: By 2010, substantially increase the supply of qualified teachers, including through international cooperation for teacher training in developing countries, especially least developed countries and small island developing States.

Large-scale learning assessment 

Large-scale learning assessments (LSLAs) are tools to monitor learning-related outcomes in the 2030 agenda. It focuses on effective acquisition of relevant knowledge, foundational and transferable skills and competencies as the basis for learning throughout life as well as learning for work and civic, social and cultural life. Learning data is viewed as an essential component of monitoring mechanisms to measure progress towards SDG 4, at the global, regional and national level.

See also 
 Global Citizenship Education
 Education for sustainable development
 Right to education
 Convention against Discrimination in Education
 International Bureau of Education
 Climate-friendly school

Sources

References 

Free content from UNESCO
Educational organizations
Sustainable Development Goals
Education International
[[Category:2010]]